Sydney Bus Museum (formerly the Sydney Bus and Truck Museum) is a not-for-profit transportation museum and education centre for public benefit located in the suburb of Leichhardt, in Sydney, Australia.

The museum is open to the public on the first and third Sunday of each month.

The museum restores, maintains, displays and operates over 70 buses from the 1920s to 2000's. This mainly includes both single-decker and double-decker buses from NSW government operations, but also includes Double-Decker buses from Hong Kong and London as well as single decker buses from NSW private operators. It also provides buses for historical celebrations, and for film and photo shoots.

History
It opened in 1986 in the former Tempe Bus Depot, with a formal opening in April 1988. Following the State Transit Authority deciding to re-open the depot for its Metrobus operation, the museum was allocated space in a disused part of Leichhardt depot in 2010. As part of the move to Leichhardt, the museum was closed between 2010 and 2016. The new site at Leichhardt was officially opened by Transport Minister Andrew Constance on 1 August 2016.

Publications
The Historic Commercial Vehicle Association launched an in-house journal in June 1965. HCVA News was a bi-monthly publication, becoming monthly in 1968. It was relaunched as Fleetline in August 1975, also becoming the house publication of the Bus & Coach Society of Victoria (BCSV) at the same time. This arrangement ceased in June 1986 when the BCSV founded its own publication, Australian Bus Panorama.

In May 1990, Fleetline became the house journal of the Transport Enthusiasts Society of South Australia. In January 2004, Fleetline was relaunched as Australian Bus and is now published quarterly.

Gallery

References

External links
Wheels in Motion

Bus transport in New South Wales
Bus museums
Museums in Sydney
Transport museums in New South Wales
1986 establishments in Australia